The Rose Terrace building is a historic building on the Mary Baldwin University campus in Staunton, Virginia. It was built about 1875, and is a 2 1/2-story, three bay, "L"-shaped, brick Italianate style building.  It has a hipped roof and six handsome, tall
chimneys with elaborately corbelled caps.  Also on the property is a contributing small two-story outbuilding known as "Little House."

Rose Terrace was originally a single family residence, then housed Augusta Sanitarium from 1910 to 1919.  The building was purchased by Mary Baldwin College in 1919. It was once used as the college president's home, and also served as a student dormitory. The building currently houses the offices of the Shakespeare & Performance graduate program.

It was listed on the National Register of Historic Places (NRHP) in 1979.

See also
Hilltop, Main, and C. W. Miller House, are other NRHP-listed building on the campus.

References

 

University and college buildings on the National Register of Historic Places in Virginia
National Register of Historic Places in Staunton, Virginia
Houses completed in 1875
Mary Baldwin University
Buildings and structures in Staunton, Virginia
Italianate architecture in Virginia